Karen Ichiuji-Ramone ( Ichiuji, May 15, 1951 – March 25, 2020), known by her stage name Karen Kamon, was an American singer and actress.

She is perhaps best known for her performance of "Manhunt" on the soundtrack to the movie Flashdance.  In 1984, her recording of "Loverboy" reached #88 on the Billboard Hot 100.  She also sang "Squeeze Play" on the soundtrack to the movie D.C. Cab and provided additional voices for the movie Oliver & Company.

In television, she appeared in one episode of the U.S. TV series T.J. Hooker.

She is listed as a production associate on Karen Carpenter's solo album and credited, on the Carpenters' compilation album Lovelines, as a friend of Karen Carpenter. She was also interviewed for the installment of VH1's series Behind the Music that dealt with "The Carpenters" and appeared in a segment in the VH1 documentary 100 Most Shocking Moments in Rock and Roll History.

Personal life
Kamon first met music producer Phil Ramone while working as a tour publicist for Peter, Paul and Mary in 1977. Ramone produced the first of two albums in her known discography, Heart of You, in 1984. She was married to him from 1984 until his death in 2013 at the age of 79. They had three children, including Matthew Ramone, general manager of Phil Ramone Incorporated.

On March 25, 2020, it was reported on a Karen Carpenter Facebook site that Kamon had died.

Discography

Albums
1984: Heart of You – Label: CBS-26017 – included the single "Loverboy," which reached #88 on the Billboard Hot 100 chart
1987: Voices – Label: ATCO-90575 (including a cover version of the Russ Ballard classic "Voices")

Soundtracks
1983: D.C. Cab: Music from the Original Motion Picture Soundtrack
1983: Flashdance: Original Soundtrack from the Motion Picture

References

External links
 

American women pop singers
American actresses
American people of Japanese descent
1951 births
2020 deaths
21st-century American women